Patricia Catherine M. Smith  (born April 14, 1957) is a Canadian lawyer and Olympic rower who was elected president of the Canadian Olympic Committee. She sits on the International Council of Arbitration for Sport.

Biography
Smith was born in Vancouver, British Columbia. She graduated from the University of British Columbia (UBC) with a B.A. in 1981 and from UBC law school in 1985. She practised law in Vancouver, B.C. She received an honorary doctorate of laws degree from UBC in 2001 for her career in sport and her work in international sport and the law.

Smith won a silver medal in the coxless pair event with Betty Craig at the 1984 Summer Olympics. She also finished fifth in the same event at the 1976 Summer Olympics and seventh in coxed four at the 1988 Summer Olympics.

Smith won seven World Championship medals and a Commonwealth Games gold medal in her career on the Canadian team that spanned from 1976 to 1988.

In 2010, she was made a member of the Order of Canada. In 2012, she was made a member of the Order of British Columbia.

In September 2013 she was elected to succeed Anita DeFrantz as Vice-President of FISA, the International Rowing Federation.

Smith was elected a vice president of the Canadian Olympic Committee in 2009. On October 3, 2015 she became the interim president after Marcel Aubut resigned his position. She was subsequently elected president at the COC Session in November 2015, and in June 2016 was nominated for membership of the International Olympic Committee.

Smith is also a member of the Board of the International Council of Arbitration for Sport, the organization that runs the Court of Arbitration for Sport, headquartered in Lausanne, Switzerland.

References

External links
 

1957 births
Living people
Canadian female rowers
Olympic rowers of Canada
Olympic silver medalists for Canada
Rowers at the 1976 Summer Olympics
Rowers at the 1984 Summer Olympics
Rowers at the 1988 Summer Olympics
Rowers from Vancouver
Olympic medalists in rowing
Members of the Order of British Columbia
Members of the Order of Canada
Medalists at the 1984 Summer Olympics
Lawyers in British Columbia
Canadian women lawyers
World Rowing Championships medalists for Canada
Commonwealth Games gold medallists for Canada
Peter A. Allard School of Law alumni
Commonwealth Games medallists in rowing
International Olympic Committee members
Rowers at the 1986 Commonwealth Games
20th-century Canadian women
Presidents of the Canadian Olympic Committee
Medallists at the 1986 Commonwealth Games